Minoo Moshiri also known as Minou Moshiri, is an essayist, literary translator, film-critic and journalist.

Early life and education 
Minoo Moshiri was born in Tehran, Iran. She attended primary and secondary school in the French Ecole Jeanne d’Arc of Tehran. She then left for England to attend the well-known finishing school "Queenwood Ladies' College" in Eastbourne. 

She attended the University of Exeter for six years to receive an M.A. Honours Degree in French and English Literature. For her M.A. thesis she chose Diderot and the 18th century and studied with the famous Diderotiste, the late Geneva-born Professor Emeritus Robert Niklaus.

Career 
Upon returning home to Tehran, she became an essayist, literary translator, film-critic and journalist and continues to be active as such. She contributes essays, literary-criticisms and other articles as well as film-reviews in Persian, English and French to some dozen literary journals and film-magazines and newspapers.

Her translation of Jose Saramago’s Blindness into Persian is in its 25th edition (2021).

Awards 
In 2006, she won Iran’s First Prize in Journalism for Social Satire.

She is a regular at Locarno, Rome, Thessaloniki and Nyon international film festivals. She was a member of the Jury at Locarno’s Critics’ Week in 2006, in Switzerland.

She was a FIPRESCI jury member at Thessaloniki International Film Festival in 2010 in Greece.

She was a FIPRESCI jury member at Thessaloniki International Documentary Festival in 2011.

She was a FIPRESCI jury member at Locarno's International Film Festival in 2013.

Chevalier des Arts et des Lettres de la Republique francaise.2017

Translations 

From English or French into Persian:

Le Neveu de Rameau, Denis Diderot
Blindness, José Saramago (25th edition in 2021)
The Notebook, José Saramago
Embers, Sandor Marai
La Nuit des Chandelles, adaptation théatrale du roman de, Sandor Marai "LES BRAISES" 2019
Adolphe, Benjamin Constant
Jacques the Fatalist, Denis Diderot
Pierre et Luce, Romain Rolland
The Life and Times of Michael K, J.M. Coetzee
The Age of Innocence, Edith Wharton
Eugénie Grandet and Le Père Goriot (critical studies)
Gustave Flaubert, Leonard Davis 
Alexandre Solzhenitzin, Alexis Klimoff
Gabriel Garcia Marquez, R. MacMurray
George Bernard Shaw, Margery Morgan
Hedda Gabler, Ibsen
Tale of Two Cities, Charles Dickens
Eleni, Nicholas Gage
Intruder and Interior, Maurice Maeterlinck
L' Indifferent, Marcel Proust

From Persian into English or French

The Crystal Garden, a novel by Mohsen Makhmalbaf
Several short stories by Abbas Kiarostami
"The Apple"
"Salam Cinema" and several other Film Scripts by Makhmalbaf 
"Mother’s Guest", film script by Dariush Mehrjui
"Bemani", film script by Dariush Mehrjui
"The Willow Tree", film script by Majid Majidi
"The Gentleman Actor", Houshang Golmakani 
Several short stories published in "Film International" written by Abolfazl Jalili, Kiomars Pourahmad, Sohrab Shahid-Saless, and many others.

If I had my life again (collected essays) 2023

References

External links 

Iranian translators
People from Tehran
Living people
Year of birth missing (living people)
People educated at Queenwood Ladies' College
Alumni of the University of Exeter